Large tumor suppressor kinase 1 (LATS1) is an enzyme that in humans is encoded by the LATS1 gene.

It has been associated with the Hippo signaling pathway, where it phosphorylates YAP and TAZ to inactivate their function.

The protein encoded by this gene is a putative serine/threonine kinase that localizes to the mitotic apparatus and complexes with cell cycle controller CDC2 kinase in early mitosis. The protein is phosphorylated in a cell-cycle dependent manner, with late prophase phosphorylation remaining through metaphase. The N-terminal region of the protein binds CDC2 to form a complex showing reduced histone H1 kinase activity, indicating a role as a negative regulator of CDC2/cyclin A. In addition, the C-terminal kinase domain binds to its own N-terminal region, suggesting potential negative regulation through interference with complex formation via intramolecular binding. Biochemical and genetic data suggest a role as a tumor suppressor. This is supported by studies in knockout mice showing development of soft-tissue sarcomas, ovarian stromal cell tumors and a high sensitivity to carcinogenic treatments.

Interactions
LATS1 has been shown to interact with Zyxin and Cdk1.

References

Further reading

EC 2.7.11